Women's singles at the 2006 Asian Games was won by Zheng Jie of the People's Republic of China.

Schedule
All times are Arabia Standard Time (UTC+03:00)

Results
Legend
r — Retired
WO — Won by walkover

Final

Top half

Bottom half

References
Women's singles draw

Women's singles